Voices is a 1973 British psychological drama thriller film directed by Kevin Billington and starring David Hemmings and Gayle Hunnicutt. It is based on the play by Richard Lortz.

Plot
The film is about the life of a young couple Robert (David Hemmings) and Claire Williams (Gayle Hunnicutt), whose idyllic existence is turned topsy turvy when their 6-year-old son David (Adam Bridge) dies accidentally by drowning while they were making love in their boat they were riding.

Through a series of flashbacks it is shown that Claire was deeply traumatized by the loss of David and after numerous suicide attempts due to her mental breakdown, she was finally hospitalized in a mental hospital. Her husband Robert had been trying to cope with the stress as well but it is apparent that the situation had become increasingly difficult for them both. After Claire gets released from the hospital, with the hope of Claire's full recovery, the couple plan a trip to the countryside where they can relax in the Georgian home, a secluded large manor which was left to Claire by her recently deceased aunt.

Their trip gets hindered due to the foggy weather. The fog is so thick that Robert avoids ramming into an oncoming car and hits a tree. When they finally reach the ancient mansion, it seems like the perfect setting for the couple to rekindle their romance but things disintegrate quickly. The situation reaches a breaking point after Claire begins hearing strange unidentifiable voices in the house.

Eventually the voices take shape and Claire comes face to face with the ghostly figure of a young girl Jessica (Eva Griffiths) playing with a toy ball who doesn't seem aware of the couple's presence. But she isn't the only ghost haunting the old house. Her mother and brother are also present. Claire desperately tries to convince Robert that she had indeed seen the ghosts but he refuses to do so. However, later both Claire and her husband Robert experience a series of unexplained supernatural events that leave them questioning their sanity as well as their very existence. 

When the couple finally decide to leave the house and go back to their car, they find out that they are dead. Back when their car had crashed into the tree, they were actually killed meaning that ever since they've arrived at the house, they've been ghosts.

Cast
 David Hemmings as Robert 
 Gayle Hunnicutt as Claire
 Lynn Farleigh as the Mother 
 Eva Griffiths as Jessica, the little girl 
 Russell Lewis as John, the little boy 
 Peggy Ann Clifford as the Medium
 Adam Bridge as David, Robert and Claire's son

Production

Filming
The film was shot on location in Hertfordshire, England and at EMI-MGM Elstree Studios.

The final scene takes place by the bridge at Tykes Water at the Aldenham Reservoir.

Music
The film's soundtrack was composed by Richard Rodney Bennett and conducted by Marcus Dods.

References

External links

1973 films
1973 horror films
British films based on plays
British horror films
1970s English-language films
Films directed by Kevin Billington
Films scored by Richard Rodney Bennett
Films set in country houses
1970s British films